This is a list of aircraft manufacturers sorted alphabetically by International Civil Aviation Organization (ICAO)/common name. It contains the ICAO/common name, manufacturers name(s), country and other data, with the known years of operation in parentheses.

The ICAO names are listed in bold. Having an ICAO name does not mean that a manufacturer is still in operation today. Just that some of the aircraft produced by that manufacturer are still flying.


B
B/E Aerospace – United States, UK, UAE, www.beaerospace.com
B&B Manufacturing Company – Valencia, Ca, www.bbmfg.com
B&W, Boeing & Westervelt – United States, (1916) > Pacific Aero
Babcock Aircraft Company
British Aircraft Corporation (BAC) Ltd – United Kingdom, (1959–1977) > British Aerospace
Bach Aircraft – United States
Bachem, Bachem – Germany, (1944–1945)
Back Bone, Tallard, France
Backcountry Super Cubs, Douglas, Wyoming, United States
BAE Systems, BAE Systems PLC – United Kingdom, (1999–present)
BAE Systems Australia, BAE Systems Australia Ltd – Australia
BAI, Bureau of Aircraft Industry – Republic of China, (1946–1969) > Air Technical Bureau
Bakeng, Bakeng Aircraft – United States
Bakeng, Gerald Bakeng – United States
Ball-Bartoe – United States
Barkley-Grow, Barkley Grow Aircraft Corporation – United States
Barnett, Barnett Rotorcraft – United States
Barr, Barr Aircraft – United States
Barrows, Bob Barrows – United States
Bartel – Poland
Bartlett Aircraft – United States
Basler, Basler Turbo Conversions Inc – United States
BAT, British Aerial Transport Co. Ltd. – United Kingdom
Bay Aviation, Bay – United States
Bayerische Flugzeugwerke, Bayerische Flugzeugwerke – Germany, (1926–1938) (BFW – Bavarian Aircraft Works) > Messerschmitt
BDC Aero Industrie, Lachute, Quebec, Canada
Bd-Micro, BD-Micro Technologies Inc – United States
Beagle, Beagle Aircraft (1969) Ltd – United Kingdom, (?-1970) > Scottish Aviation
Beagle, Beagle Aircraft Ltd – United Kingdom
Beagle-Auster, Beagle-Auster Ltd – United Kingdom
Beardmore, William Beardmore & Co – United Kingdom
Beaujon Aircraft – United States
Bede, BD Micro Technologies Inc – United States
Bede, Bede Aircraft Corporation – United States
Bede, Bede Aircraft Inc – United States
Bede, Bede Aviation Corporation – United States
Bede, Bede Jet Corporation – United States
Bede, BEDEAmerica Aerosport LLC – United States
Beech, Beech Aircraft Corporation – United States, (1932–1980) > Raytheon > Hawker Beechcraft
Beech-Sferma, see BEECH and SFERMA – United States/France
Beecraft, Bee Aviation Associates, Inc. – United States, (1948–1960)
Beets, Glenn Beets – United States
Beijing Keyuan, Beijing Keyuan Light Aircraft Industrial Company Ltd – China
Belairbus, Belairbus – Belgium, (1979–present)
Bel-Aire, Bel-Aire Aviation – United States
Bell, Bell Aircraft Corporation – United States, (1935–1960)
Bell, Bell Helicopter Company, Division of Bell Aerospace Corporation – United States, (1960–present)
Bell, Bell Helicopter Textron Inc – United States
Bell, Bell Helicopter Textron, Division of Textron Canada Ltd – Canada
Bell, Bell Helicopter Textron, Division of Textron Inc – United States
Bell-Agusta, Bell-Agusta Aerospace Company – United States/Italy
Bellanca, Bellanca Aircraft Corporation – United States, (1927–1983) > AviaBellanca
Bellanca, Bellanca Aircraft Engineering – United States
Bellanca, Bellanca Inc – United States
Bellanca, Bellanca Sales Manufacturing Inc – United States
Bell-Boeing, see BELL and BOEING – United States
Beneš & Hajn, Beneš & Hajn – Unknown, (1923) > Avia
Beneš-Mráz – Czechoslovakia
Bengis, Bengis Aircraft Company (Pty) Ltd – South Africa
Bensen, Bensen Aircraft Corporation – United States, (?-1987)
 Bereznyak-Isayev, Alexander Yakovlevich Bereznyak and Alexei Mikhailovich Isayev – Soviet Union
Berger, Hans Berger – Switzerland
Beriev, Beriev OKB – Russia, (1934–present) (Beriev Aircraft Company)
Beriev, Berieva Aviatsionnyi Kompaniya – Russia
Beriev, Taganrogsky Aviatsionnyi Nauchno-Tekhnicheskiy Kompleks Imeni G. M. Berieva – Russia
Berkut, Berkut Engineering Inc – United States
Berliner, Berliner Aircraft Co. – United States, (1926–1929) > Berliner-Joyce
Berliner-Joyce, Berliner-Joyce Aircraft Corp. – United States, (1929–?)
Bernard, Société des Avions Bernard – France
Berwick, FW Berwick and Company Ltd. – United Kingdom
Besson, Besson – France, (1915–1928) > ANF Mureaux
Best Off, Best Off – France, (?-present)
Bharat, Bharat Heavy Electricals Ltd – India
Billie, Billie Aero Marine – France
Bilsam Aviation, Poznań, Poland
Binder, Binder Aviatik KG – Germany
Birdman, Birdman Aircraft, US
Birdman, Birdman Enterprises, Canada
Bisnovat, Bisnovat – Russia
Bitz, Bitz Flugzeugbau GmbH – Germany
Bitz, Fa. Josef Bitz – Germany
Blackburn, Blackburn Aircraft Ltd – United Kingdom, (1914–1949) > General Aircraft Ltd
Blackshape srl, Monopoli, Italy
Blackwing Sweden, Lund, Sweden
Blériot, Société Blériot Aéronautique – France, (1906–1914) > Blériot-SPAD
Blériot-SPAD, Blériot-SPAD – France, (1914–1936) > Sud-Ouest
Blériot-Voisin, Blériot-Voisin – France, (1903–1906) > Blériot, Voisin
Bloch, Societé des Avions Marcel Bloch – France, (1930–1936) (1945) > Sud-Ouest, Dassault
Blohm & Voss, Blohm Und Voss – Germany, (1930–1969) > Messerschmitt-Bölkow-Blohm
Blue Yonder, Blue Yonder Aviation Inc – Canada
Blume, Walter Blume – Germany
B-N Group, B-N Group Ltd – United Kingdom, (1964–present) (Britten-Norman)
Boeing, Boeing Aircraft Company – United States, (1916–present)
Boeing, The Boeing Airplane Company – United States
Boeing, The Boeing Company – United States
Boeing Canada, Boeing Aircraft of Canada Ltd – Canada
Boeing North American, Boeing North American, Inc. – United States, (1996–present)
Boeing Vertol, Boeing Vertol Company – United States
Boeing-Sikorsky, see BOEING and SIKORSKY – United States
Boeve, Boeve Fiberglass Components Inc – United States
Bohemia, Bohemia – Czech Republic
Boisavia, Société Boisavia – France
Bolkow, Bölkow-Apparatebau GmbH – Germany, (1948–1968) > Messerschmitt-Bölkow
Bolkow, Bölkow-Entwicklungen GmbH – Germany
Booth Aerospace North America – United States
Bombardier, Bombardier Inc – Canada, (1986–present)
Borel, Etablissements Borel, France > SGCIM
Boulton & Paul Ltd United Kingdom, (1914–1934)
Boulton Paul Aircraft Ltd  – United Kingdom, (1934–1961)
Bowers, Peter M. Bowers – United States
Bradley, Bradley Aerospace – United States
Brandenburg, Brandenburg – Germany
Brandli, Max Brändli – Switzerland
Brantly, Brantly Helicopter Corporation – United States
Brantly, Brantly Helicopter Industries USA Company Ltd – United States
Brantly, Brantly International Inc (Helicopter Division) – United States
Brantly-Hynes, Brantly-Hynes Helicopter Inc – United States, (1975–?)
Bratukhin, Bratukhin – Russia, (1940–1951)
Brditschka, H. W. Brditschka OHG – Austria
Brditschka, HB-Brditschka GmbH & Co KG – Austria
Breda, Societa Italiana Ernesto Breda – Italy
Bredanardi, BredaNardi Costruzione Aeronautiche SpA – Italy
Breguet, Société des Ateliers d'Aviation Louis Bréguet – France, (1911–1969) > Dassault-Breguet
Brewster, Brewster Aeronautical Corporation – United States, (1932–1946)
Brian Allen, Brian Allen Aviation – United Kingdom
Briegleb, Gus Briegleb – US
Bristol, Bristol Aircraft Ltd – United Kingdom, (1910–1959) > British Aircraft Corporation
Bristol, The Bristol Aeroplane Company Ltd – United Kingdom
Bristol Helicopter, Bristol Helicopter Ltd. – United Kingdom, (1944–1969) > Westland Aircraft
British Aerospace, British Aerospace – United Kingdom, (1977–1999) (BAe) > BAE Systems
British Aerospace, British Aerospace PLC – United Kingdom
British Aircraft Company, British Aircraft Company – United Kingdom
British Aircraft Manufacturing, British Aircraft Mfg. Co. – United Kingdom, (BAMC)
British Klemm, British Aircraft Klemm Aeroplane Co Ltd. – United Kingdom, > British Aircraft Mfg. Co.
Britten-Norman, Britten-Norman (Bembridge) Ltd – United Kingdom
Britten-Norman, Britten-Norman Ltd – United Kingdom, (1964–present)
BRM Costruções Aeronáuticas, Pero Pinheiro, Portugal
Brochet, Constructions Aéronautiques Maurice Brochet – France
Ken Brock Manufacturing, Stanton, California, United States
Brokaw, Bergon Brokaw – US
Brooklands, Brooklands Aerospace Ltd – United Kingdom
Brooklands, Brooklands Aircraft Ltd – United Kingdom
Brügger, Max Brügger – Switzerland
Brush Electrical, Brush Electrical Engineering Co. Ltd. – United Kingdom, (Originally Anglo-American Brush Electric Light Corporation)
Brutsche Aircraft Corporation, Salt Lake City, Utah, United States
Buchanan, Buchanan Aircraft Corporation Ltd – Australia
Bucker, Bücker Flugzeugbau GmbH – Germany, (1932–1945)
Bucker Prado, Bücker Prado SL – Spain
București, Intreprinderea de Avioane București – Romania
Budd Manufacturing, Edward G. Budd Manufacturing Company – United States
Buethe, Buethe Enterprises Inc – United States
Buhl, Buhl Aircraft Company – United States
Bul, Bourgogne Ultra Léger Aviation – France
Burgess, Burgess Company – United States, (1911–1916) (Originally Burgess Company and Curtis, Inc.)
Büttner Propeller, Gerald Büttner – Obernkirchen, Obernkirchen, Germany
Burl's Aircraft, Chugiak, Alaska – United States, (1982–Present) 
Burnelli, Burnelli Aircraft Co. – United States
Bushby, Bushby Aircraft Inc – United States
Bushby, Bushby Aircraft Inc – United States
Bye Aerospace, Englewood, Colorado, United States

C
C. Itoh, C. Itoh & Co – Japan, (1955–1970) > JAMCO
CAARP, Cooperatives des Ateliers Aéronautiques de la Région Parisienne – France
CAB, Constructions Aéronautiques du Béarn – France
Cable-Price, Cable-Price Corporation – New Zealand
Cabrinha, Cabrinha Aircraft Corporation – United States
Cabrinha, Cabrinha Engineering Inc – United States
CAG, Construcciones Aeronáuticas de Galicia – Spain
Caldas Aeronautica, Pali, Colombia
Calipt'Air, Spiez, Switzerland
Callair, Call Aircraft Company – United States, (1939–1959) > IMCO
Callair, Callair Inc – United States
Calumet, Calumet Motorsports Inc – United States
Camair, Camair Aircraft Corporation – United States
Camair, Camair Division of Cameron Iron Works Inc – United States
CAMCO, Central Aircraft Manufacturing Company – China, CAMCO
Cameron, Cameron & Sons Aircraft – United States
Campana, Campana Aviation – France
CAMS, Chantiers Aéro-Maritimes de la Seine – France
CAMS, Cairns Development Company – United States, (or Cairns Aircraft (E. B. Cams))
Calumet Motorsports, Lansing, Illinois, United States
Canada Air RV, Canada Air RV Inc – Canada
Canadair, Bombardier Aerospace Canadair – Canada, (?-1986) > Bombardier Aerospace
Canadair, Canadair Group of Bombardier Inc – Canada
Canadair, Canadair Inc – Canada
Canadair, Canadair Ltd – Canada
Canadian Aeroplanes, Canadian Aeroplanes Ltd. – Canada
Canadian Car & Foundry, Canadian Car & Foundry Co. – Canada
Canadian Home Rotors, Canadian Home Rotors Inc – Canada
Canadian Vickers, Canadian Vickers Ltd – Canada
Canard Aviation – Switzerland
CANSA, Cansa – Italy
CANT, Cantiere Navale Triestino – Italy, (?-1931) > CRDA
CAO/SNCAO, Societe Nationale de Construction Aeronautique de l'Ouest – France
CAP – Companhia Aéronautica Paulista – Brazil
CAP Aviation, CAP Aviation – France
Capella, Capella Aircraft Corporation, Austin, Texas, United States
Caproni, Caproni – Italy, (1908–1983) > Agusta
Caproni Vizzola, Caproni Vizzola Costruzione Aeronautiche SpA – Italy
Carlson, Carlson Aircraft Inc – United States
CARMAM, Coopérative d'Approvisionnement et de Réparation de Matériel Aéronautique de Moulins  – France
Carplane GmbH, Braunschweig, Germany
Carriou, Louis Carriou – France
Carstedt, Carstedt – United Kingdom
Cartercopters, CarterCopters LLC – United States
CASA, Construcciones Aeronáuticas SA – Spain
Caspar, Caspar-Werke – Germany
Cassutt, Thomas K. Cassutt – United States
CATA, Construction Aéronautique de Technologie Avancée – France
Caudron, British Caudron Co Ltd. – United Kingdom, (Last aircraft made in 1919, went into receivership 1924.)
Caudron, Caudron – France, (1909–?)
Cavalier, Cavalier Aircraft Corp. – United States, (?-1971) > Piper Aircraft
CCF, Canadian Car & Foundry Company Ltd – Canada
CEI, CEI – United States
Celier Aviation, CA – Poland
Celair, Celair (Pty) Ltd – South Africa
Centrair, SA Centrair – France
Central Aircraft Company, Central Aircraft Company Limited – United Kingdom
Centrala Flygverkstaden Malmslätt (CFM) – Sweden
Centrala Verkstaden Malmslätt (CVM) – Sweden
Centre Est, Centre Est Aéronautique – France
Century, Century Aircraft Corporation – United States
CERVA, Consortium Européen de Réalisation et de Vente d'Avions GIE – France
Cessna, Cessna Aircraft Company – United States, (1927–present)
Cessna-Roos, Cessna-Roos Aircraft Company – United States, (1927) > Cessna Aircraft
Clyde Cessna, Clyde Cessna – United States, (1911) (Clyde Vernon Cessna) > Travel Air
Cessna-Reims, Cessna-Reims – United States/France
CFA, Compagnie Française d'Aviation – France
CFM, CFM Aircraft Ltd – United Kingdom
CFM, Cook Flying Machines, CFM Metal Fax Ltd – United Kingdom
CFM Air, Ciriè, Italy
CGS Aviation, Grand Bay, Alabama, United States
Chadwick, Chadwick Helicopters – United States
Chalard, Jacques et Renée Chalard – France
Champion, Champion Aircraft Company Inc – United States, (1954–1970) > Bellanca
Champion, Champion Aircraft Corporation – United States
Chance Vought, Chance Vought Aircraft Inc – United States, (1922–1961) > Vought
Chance Vought, Chance Vought Corporation – United States
Changhe, Changhe Aircraft Factory – China
Changhe, Changhe Aircraft Industries Corporation – China
Changhe, Changhe Aircraft Manufacturing Corporation – China
Chasle, Yves Chasle – France
Chayair, Chayair Manufacturing and Aviation – South Africa
Chengdu, Chengdu Aircraft Industrial Corporation – China
Chernov, Opytnyi Konstruktorskoye Byuro Chernov B & M OOO – Russia
Chetverikov, Chetverikov – Russia, (Igor Vyacheslavovich Chetverikov)
Chichester-Miles, Chichester-Miles Consultants Ltd – United Kingdom
Chilton, Chilton Aircraft – United Kingdom, (1937–?)
Chincul, Chincul SACAIFI – Argentina
Chris Tena, Chris Tena Aircraft Association – United States
Chrislea, Chrislea Aircraft Co. Ltd. – United Kingdom
Christen, Christen Industries Inc – United States
Chu, Major General C.J. Chu – Republic of China
Cicaré, Cicaré Helicópteros SA – Argentina
Cierva, Cierva Autogyro Company – United Kingdom, (Juan de la Cierva)
Circa, Circa Reproductions – Canada
Cirrus, Cirrus Design Corporation – United States, (1984–present)
Citroen-Marchetti, Citroen-Marchetti – France
Civil Aviation Department of India – India
Claassen, Claassen – United States
CLASS, Canadian Light Aircraft Sales and Services Inc – Canada
Classic, Classic Aircraft Corporation (WACO Classic Aircraft Corporation) – United States
Classic Fighter, Classic Fighter Industries Inc – United States
Classic Sport, Classic Sport Aircraft – United States
Claudius Dornier, Claudius Dornier Seastar GmbH & Co KG – Germany
Claxton High School – United States
Clément-Bayard – France
Clifford Aeroworks, Clifford Aeroworks – United States
Clutton, Eric Clutton – United Kingdom
CMASA, Costruzioni Meccaniche Aeronautiche Società Anonima – Italy
CNA, Compagnia Nazionale Aeronautica – Italy
CNIAR, Centrul National al Industriei Aeronautice Române – Romania
CNNA, Companhia Nacional de Navegação Aérea – Brazil
Coandă, Henri Coandă – Romania, (1910–1911) (Henri Marie Coandă) > Bristol
COBELAVIA, Compagnie Belge d'Aviation – Belgium
Cobra, Cobra Aviation – Australia
Cody, Samuel Cody – United Kingdom, (Samuel Franklin Cody)
Colemill, Colemill Enterprises Inc – United States
Collins, Collins Aero – United States
Colomban, Michel Colomban – France
Colombia, Columbia Aircraft Company – United States
Colonial, Colonial Aircraft Corporation – United States
COMAC, Commercial Aircraft Corporation of China – China (2008–present)
Commander, Commander Aircraft Company – United States
Commonwealth (1), Commonwealth Aircraft Corporation Pty Ltd – Australia (CAC)
Commonwealth (2), Commonwealth Aircraft Corporation Inc – United States, (1942–1947)
Comper, Comper Aircraft Co. Ltd. – United Kingdom, (1929–?)
Comte, Comte Aircraft Factory – Switzerland
Conair, Conair Group Inc. – Canada
Condor Powered Parachutes, Nicholson, Georgia, United States, (later called Southern Powered Parachutes)
Conroy, Conroy Aircraft Corporation – United States
Consolidated Aeronautics Corporation – manufactured Lake aircraft in the 1960s–70s – United States
Consolidated, Consolidated Aircraft Corporation – United States
Continental Copters, Continental Copters Inc – United States
Convair, Consolidated-Vultee Aircraft Corporation – United States, (1943–1996) > General Dynamics
Convair, Convair Division of General Dynamics Corporation – United States
 Corben Sport Plane and Supply Company (US) – founded 1931, sold to Paul Poberezny in 1952
Corby, John C. Corby – Australia
Cosy, Cosy Europe – Germany
Country Air, Country Air Inc – United States
Coupe, Coupé-Aviation – France
Cox-Klemin, Cox-Klemin Aircraft Corporation – United States
Co-Z, Co-Z Development Corporation – United States
Co-Z, Co-Z Europa – Germany
Crae, CRAE Elettromeccanica SpA – Italy
Craiova, Intreprinderea de Avioane Craiova – Romania
Cranfield, Cranfield Institute of Technology, College of Aeronautics – United Kingdom
CRDA, Cantiere Riuniti dell'Adriatico – Italy (1931–?)
Creative Flight, Creative Flight Inc – Canada
Croses, Emilien Croses – France
CSS, Centralne Studium Samolotów – Poland
CTRM, Composites Technology Research Malaysia Sdn Bhd – Malaysia
Cub, Cub Aircraft Company – Canada
Cub Crafters, Cub Crafters Inc – United States
Culp, Culps Specialties – United States
Culver, Culver Aircraft Company – United States
Cunliffe-Owen, Cunliffe-Owen Aircraft – United Kingdom
Curtiss, Curtiss-Wright Corporation – United States, (1929–present)
Curtiss Aeroplane and Motor Company, Curtiss Aeroplane and Motor Company – United States, (1909–1929) > Curtiss-Wright
Curtiss-Reid Aircraft Ltd., Curtiss-Reid Aircraft Ltd. – Canada
Custer Channel Wing Corporation, Hagerstown, Maryland – United States
Custom Flight, Custom Flight Components Ltd – Canada
Custom Flight Limited,  Tiny, Ontario, Canada
Cvjetkovic, Anton Cvjetkovic – United States
C.W. Aircraft Ltd – United Kingdom > General Aircraft Ltd
CWL, Centralne Warsztaty Lotnicze – Poland
CZAW, Czech Aircraft Works SRO – Czech Republic
Cyclone Manufacturing Inc., Mississauga, Ontario, Canada (Aerospace Parts Manufacturing)
CZL, Centralne Zaklady Lotnicze – Poland, (Central Aviation Establishment) 
Cirrus aircraft co.

See also
 Aircraft
 List of aircraft engine manufacturers
 List of aircraft manufacturers

B

de:Liste der Flugzeughersteller
fr:Liste des constructeurs aéronautiques